Jillian Lauren (born August 16, 1973) is an American writer, performer, adoption advocate, and former call girl for Jefri Bolkiah, Prince of Brunei; about whom she wrote her first memoir, Some Girls: My Life in a Harem.

Writing
Jillian Lauren is the author of the New York Times bestselling memoir books Everything You Ever Wanted, released May 2015, Some Girls: My Life in a Harem, released in 2010, and the 2011 novel Pretty, all published by Plume/Penguin. Some Girls, which chronicles her time spent in the harem of the Prince of Brunei, has been translated into eighteen languages.

Lauren's true crime book Behold the Monster: Facing America’s Most Prolific Serial Killer was published by Dutton in 2020. The book is based on the author's extensive interviews with serial killer Samuel Little. Her work attempting to seek justice for Little's victims and match cold cases to him is chronicled in the 2021 five-part documentary series, Confronting a Serial Killer.

Lauren has an MFA in creative writing from Antioch University. Her writing has appeared in New York Magazine, The Paris Review, The New York Times, Vanity Fair, Los Angeles Magazine, Elle, Flaunt Magazine, The Rumpus, and Salon, among others. Her work has also been widely anthologized, including The Moth Anthology and True Tales of Lust and Love.

Lauren is a regular storyteller with The Moth and has performed at numerous spoken word and storytelling events across the United States. She did a TEDx Talk about adoption and identity at Chapman University in 2014. She has been interviewed on such television programs as The View, Good Morning America, and The Howard Stern Show, among others.

Lauren has blogged at MSNBC Today Moms and The Huffington Post.

Personal life
Lauren grew up in Livingston, New Jersey, and graduated in 1991 from Newark Academy. She later moved to New York City, where she briefly studied acting at New York University.

Lauren is married to Weezer bassist Scott Shriner. They live in Los Angeles and adopted a boy from Ethiopia on January 23, 2009.

References

External links

 Official site
 WTF with Marc Maron Podcast – Episode 234 – Jillian Lauren

American women writers
Living people
1973 births
American prostitutes
21st-century American women